An apologia is a speech or writing that defends the speaker or author's position.

Apologia may also refer to:
Apology (Plato)
Apology (Xenophon)
Apologia Pro Vita Sua, a Christian studies book
Apologia (album), a 2002 indie album

See also
Apology (disambiguation)
Apologetics
Christian apologetics